ABS-CBN presents Agimat: Ang Mga Alamat ni Ramon Revilla (The Amulet: The Chronicles of Ramon Revilla) is a series based on the movies of Ramon Revilla Sr. of the 1990s and 2000s, which features the Filipino cultural belief in the powers of an agimat or amulet. The milieu of the characters and stories are primarily set in Cavite province where the belief in amulets remains strong to this day.

The Agimat series comprises four titles. Tiagong Akyat is played by Gerald Anderson wherein he has superhuman strength, speed, and the ability to climb high walls through his amulet that makes him invincible. Tonyong Bayawak is played by Coco Martin and has the abilities and characteristics of the bayawak (monitor lizard). Elias Paniki is played by Jake Cuenca who has the quest to destroy all witches and warlocks.

But during Season 2, it had now transformed into an afternoon mini-series as part of the Haponstatic  block, now Kapamilya Gold. Bianong Bulag is played by Jason Abalos a blind young man who gets a hold of an amulet that makes him a deadly sharpshooter, a special power he uses to help those in need. Kapitan Inggo is played again by Jolo Revilla which has the power to ward off bullets and conquer his enemies.

The series aired on ABS-CBN, locally available in the Philippines. The network announced that the Agimat series was unofficially cancelled due to poor ratings on March 18, 2011, as it was replaced by Wansapanataym. Installments that did not push through were Pepeng Kuryente and Boy Putik, which were supposed to star Ejay Falcon and Enchong Dee, respectively.

Season 1

Tiagong Akyat

Pepeng Agimat

Tonyong Bayawak

Elias Paniki

Season 2

Bianong Bulag

Kapitan Inggo

NOTE: Aside from Saturday night (August 15, 2009, as Tiagong Akyat; August 21, 2010, as Elias Paniki), Season 2 was already moved to January 24, 2011, but unofficially ended on March 18 for the cancellation of the series.

See also
 List of programs broadcast by ABS-CBN
 List of programs previously aired by ABS-CBN
 Tiagong Akyat
 Pepeng Agimat
 Tonyong Bayawak
 Elias Paniki
Poloniong Takas

References

External links

ABS-CBN original programming
Philippine anthology television series
2009 Philippine television series debuts
2011 Philippine television series endings
Television series by Dreamscape Entertainment Television
Filipino-language television shows